Chowringhee (also Chourangi) is a neighbourhood of Central Kolkata, in Kolkata district in the Indian state of West Bengal. Chowringhee Road (officially Jawaharlal Nehru Road) runs on its western side. A neighbourhood steeped in history, it is a business district, as well as a shopper's destination and entertainment-hotel centre.

Etymology
The name 'Chowringhee' has defied etymologists. There is, however, the legend of a Nath yogi, Chouranginath, who discovered an image of the goddess Kali's face and built the first Kalighat temple.

History

The village

In the seventeenth century or prior to it, the area now occupied by the Maidan and Esplanade  was a tiger-infested jungle. At the eastern end of it was an old road, which had once been built by the Sabarna Roy Choudhury family from Barisha to Halisahar. In that region were three small hamlets – Chowringhee, Birjee and Colimba.

Urbanisation
The strengthening of British power, subsequent to their victory in the Battle of Plassey was followed by the construction of the new Fort William, in 1758. The European inhabitants of Kalikata gradually forsook the narrow limits of the old palisades and moved to around the Maidan.

The neighbourhood

Camac Street (renamed Abanindranath Tagore Sarani) running from Park Street to Circular Road was named after William Camac, a senior merchant in the days of Cornwallis and Wellesley. Wood Street was named after Henry Wood. Free School Street (renamed Mirza Ghalib Street), named after a Free School established there in 1786, was a bamboo jungle in 1780.

New names

Indian independence saw a rush to rename streets. The process has slowed as few streets are left to be renamed. Chowringhee Road was renamed after Jawaharlal Nehru, the first Prime Minister of India. Park Street was renamed after Mother Teresa. Theatre Road was renamed after William Shakespeare. Harrington Street was renamed after the leader of the Vietnam independence movement, Ho Chi Minh. Camac Street has been renamed after the great artist Abanindranath Tagore. Russel Street was renamed after industrialist Anandi Lal Poddar. Free School Street was renamed  after the Urdu/Persian poet Mirza Ghalib. Kyd Street was renamed Dr. Md. Ishaque Road. Lindsay Street was renamed after Nellie Sengupta.

Geography
Park Street Flyover was inaugurated on 19 February 2005.

Creative inspiration
In 1981, Aparna Sen wrote and directed a film, 36 Chowringhee Lane, about an aged Anglo-Indian school teacher who lives a lonely life in a single-room flat in the neighbourhood.

Gallery

External links

References

Neighbourhoods in Kolkata
Shopping districts and streets in India